Henry Thomas Rainey (August 20, 1860 – August 19, 1934) was an American politician. A member of the Democratic Party from Illinois, he served in the United States House of Representatives from 1903 to 1921 and from 1923 to his death. He rose to Speaker of the House, during the famous Hundred days of Franklin D. Roosevelt in 1933.

Biography

Early years
Rainey attended the public schools and Knox Academy and Knox College, Galesburg, Illinois. He transferred to, and  graduated from Amherst College in 1883 and then the Northwestern University School of Law, in Chicago which he graduated in 1885. He was admitted to the bar in 1885 and commenced practice in Carrollton, Illinois.

Political career
Rainey was appointed master in chancery for Greene County, Illinois, from 1887 until 1895, when he resigned, and returned to private practice. He then decided to return to politics in 1902 getting elected to Congress and serving for nine terms before losing to Guy L. Shaw in 1920. Two years later, he won back his seat and served until his death.

Leadership
Due to the Great Depression, the Republican party lost its majority in a landslide, and, with John Nance Garner elevated to the Speakership, Rainey ran for, and  defeated John McDuffie for the Majority leadership. McDuffie remained as Whip.

Speaker of the House
 With Speaker Garner having  been inaugurated Vice President on March 4, 1933, Rainey, being next in line, was elected Speaker of the House when President Roosevelt called a special session of Congress two days later. Rainey gave the Roosevelt administration carte blanche to do whatever it wanted, allowing almost the entire New Deal to be passed with little or no changes.

More reforms were passed during the regular session starting December. Rainey died of a heart attack the following summer, on the eve of his seventy-fourth birthday, before the new Congress could meet.

See also
Henry T. Rainey Farm
List of United States Congress members who died in office (1900–1949)

Further reading

External links 

 
 

1860 births
1934 deaths
19th-century American lawyers
19th-century American politicians
20th-century American lawyers
20th-century American politicians
Amherst College alumni
Democratic Party members of the United States House of Representatives from Illinois
Illinois lawyers
Illinois state court judges
Knox College (Illinois) alumni
Majority leaders of the United States House of Representatives
Northwestern University Pritzker School of Law alumni
People from Carrollton, Illinois
Speakers of the United States House of Representatives